In enzymology, a hydroxylamine reductase is an enzyme that catalyzes the chemical reaction

NH3 + H2O + acceptor  hydroxylamine + reduced acceptor

The 3 substrates of this enzyme are NH3, H2O, and acceptor, whereas its two products are hydroxylamine and reduced acceptor.

This enzyme belongs to the family of oxidoreductases, specifically those acting on other nitrogenous compounds as donors with other acceptors.  The systematic name of this enzyme class is ammonia:acceptor oxidoreductase. Other names in common use include hydroxylamine (acceptor) reductase, and ammonia:(acceptor) oxidoreductase.  This enzyme participates in nitrogen metabolism.  It has 2 cofactors: FAD,  and Flavoprotein.

References

 
 
 

EC 1.7.99
Flavoproteins
Enzymes of unknown structure